Vern Pullens (born 1929 Bogalusa, Louisiana; died 2001) was an American Rockabilly and country singer.

Pullens began his career in September 1956 with Bop Crazy Baby and It's My life for Houston-based Spade Records. At the time Pullens worked as a bricklayer so could only record on the weekends. After a long absence from the studios Pullens returned in 1975 as part of a rockabilly revival.

Discography

References 

1929 births
2001 deaths
People from Bogalusa, Louisiana
American rockabilly musicians
20th-century American singers
Country musicians from Louisiana
20th-century American male singers